Ava Cadell (born Ildiko Eva Csath; June 15, 1956) is a former actress, writer, producer and currently a therapist and speaker on issues of sexuality.

Career 
Cadell has a doctorate in human behavior from Newport University (California) and a doctorate of education in human sexuality from the Institute for Advanced Study of Human Sexuality in San Francisco. She then embarked upon teaching, writing and lecturing, based out of Los Angeles. Through her private practice, Cadell counsels individuals and couples on personal issues including infidelity, orgasm barriers, performance problems, sexual compulsion, parental concerns, power struggles, anger management, fear of intimacy, lack of communication and lack of desire.

Filmography

References

External links 
 
 

1956 births
American sexologists
Living people
Newport University (California) alumni
Hungarian emigrants to the United States
Institute for Advanced Study of Human Sexuality alumni